The Battle of Sarmin, also known as the Battle of Tell Danith, took place on September 14, 1115 with Roger of Salerno's Crusader army surprising and routing the Seljuk Turkish army of Bursuq ibn Bursuq of Hamadan. It is also known as the First Battle of Tell Danith, distinguishing it from the Battle of Hab of 1119, the Second Battle of Tell Danith.

Background
In November 1114, a severe earthquake struck the Principality of Antioch, damaging many of its castles. The following spring, while supervising the repair of his strongholds, Prince Roger heard rumors of a Turkish invasion. Since 1111, the Seljuk sultan Muhammad I Tapar had directed a series of attacks on Antioch and the County of Edessa, which were both established in 1098 by Frankish crusading lords and their followers. In 1115, the Sultan sent Bursuq against Antioch. Jealous that their authority would be diminished if the Sultan's forces proved victorious, several Syrian Muslim princes allied themselves with the Latins.

Roger sent spies to observe his enemy's movements, gathered provisions for his army and put his principality into a state of defense. He then advanced to Atharib, about c.  east of Antioch and c.  west of Aleppo. Here Roger came to an agreement with his Muslim allies, Toghtekin of Damascus, Ilghazi of Mardin, and Lu'lu' al-Yaya of Aleppo. Subsequently, both Christians and Muslims were embarrassed by this pact.

Campaign
The allies moved 80 kilometers south to the walled town of Afamiya. This move placed the combined army where it could maneuver to protect Aleppo, Damascus, or Antioch. Once he was certain the Turks were on the march, Roger sent a messenger to King Baldwin I of Jerusalem requesting assistance. The Turkish commander soon made his camp at Shaizar, only 12 kilometers northwest of Hama.

Baldwin immediately mobilized 500 knights and 1,000 foot soldiers from the Kingdom of Jerusalem and started north. On his way, he added Count Pons with 200 knights and 2,000 infantry from the County of Tripoli to his army. He sent a message forbidding Roger from engaging the enemy before his reinforcements arrived.

Bursuq's forces soon closed around Roger's armed camp, attempting to lure the Antiochenes and their allies into a premature attack. Their harassing attacks severely provoked the Latins. Such was the eagerness of the Frankish knights to close with their enemies that Roger threatened to put out the eyes of any man who sallied out of the camp without permission. Later, he rode through the camp with his sword drawn to emphasize his point.

When Bursuq heard of Baldwin's relieving force, he withdrew to the east. Counting the 5,000 followers of his Muslim allies, Baldwin's combined army may have been as large as 10,700 men. The allies advanced to Shaizar and burned the lower town as punishment for aligning itself with the Seljuks. When Bursuq didn't turn back to defend the town, the allied leaders assumed the campaign was over. The Muslim Syrians and the Christian princes took their followers home.

Battle
As soon as the allied host dispersed, Bursuq invaded again and captured the Christian-held town of Kafr Tab, near Afamiya. Wearily, Roger recalled his Antiochene army and took to the field again with 700 cavalry and 2,000 infantry. Some forces from the nearby County of Edessa also participated. Meanwhile, Bursuq took his army in the direction of Zerdana, c.  east-southeast of Antioch.

Early on September 14, Roger received intelligence that his opponents were carelessly going into camp at the Tell Danith watering point, near Sarmin. He rapidly advanced and took Bursuq's army by complete surprise. As the Crusaders launched their attack, some Turkish soldiers were still straggling into the camp. Roger marshalled the Frankish army into left, center, and right divisions. Baldwin, Count of Edessa led the left wing while Prince Roger personally commanded the center. The Crusaders attacked in echelon with the left wing leading.

Once the fighting began, the issue was not long in doubt. On the left the Franks soon broke the main strength of the Turks, who had withdrawn to a hillside behind their camp, while Roger occupied the camp itself. Only on the right were the Franks in difficulties.

On the Frankish right, the Turcopoles, who were employed as archers, were thrown back by a Seljuk counterattack. This disrupted the knights who faced tough fighting before repulsing their enemies on this part of the field. Roger decisively defeated Bursuq's army, ending the long campaign.

Aftermath
At least 3,000 Turks were killed and many captured, along with property worth 300,000 bezants. Frankish losses were probably light. In the spring, Bursuq's army was probably larger than the army of Roger and his Syrian allies. The Turkish general withdrew in the face of Baldwin's advance, indicating that the King of Jerusalem may have achieved superiority in numbers, or at least parity. Bursuq's army may have dwindled as the campaign dragged on, since it is known that some of the emirs were upset with his division of the spoils. Roger mustered 2,000 in the spring, but, without support from his recent Christian and Muslim allies, he may have called up a larger army for his fall campaign, perhaps 3,000 men.

Roger's victory preserved the Crusader hold on Antioch. But four years later, Roger was to lose his life and his army at the Battle of Ager Sanguinis.

References

Further reading

 

Sarmin
Battles involving the Seljuk Empire
Conflicts in 1115
1115 in Asia
12th century in the Seljuk Empire
1110s in the Crusader states